Donna Stonecipher is an American poet.

Life
She grew up in Seattle and Teheran, and lived in Prague from 1994 to 1998. She graduated from the University of Iowa Writers' Workshop, with an MFA in 2001. She completed her PhD in English and Creative Writing at the University of Georgia.

She has published five books of poetry and one of prose, as well as several translations. Her poems have appeared in Paris Review, Denver Quarterly, the Indiana Review, New American Writing, SAND Journal and Conjunctions.

She translates from French and German. Her translations have appeared in Circumference, Action Yes, chicagopostmodernpoetry.

The New York Times named her 2018 collection Transaction Histories one of the 10 best poetry books of the year.

In 2020, her book Model City sold hundreds of copies after an enthusiastic review in Frank Skinner's Poetry Podcast. A bilingual version, translated in French by Jérémy Victor Robert, was published in February 2021.

She has lived in Berlin, Germany since 2004.

Awards
 2015 NEA Translation Grant
 2007 National Poetry Series
 2002 Contemporary Poetry Series

Works

Collections

Poems
 "Inlay (Kafka)", Gut Cult Issue 7
 "White Mouth", Conjunctions
 "Model City", Paris Review

Translations
 
 
 "My Private Leningrad", No Man's Land, Andrej Glusgold
 "Landscape", No Man's Land, Andrej Glusgold

Criticism
  
"On Cole Swensen’s Ours", Jacket 26, 2008

Anthologies

Further reading
"Donna Stonecipher, Global Flaneur", hyperallergic.com, 2018
"The Limits of Cosmopolitanism", Boston Review, 2019
"This Is Not an Essay on Poetry of the Past 20 Years", Public Books, 2020
"Donna Stonecipher et ses ballades dans la ville", Télérama, 2021

References

External links
"Emmanuel Moses (Donna Stonecipher, translator)", Chicago Poet Modern Poetry

Living people
University of Iowa alumni
American women poets
Year of birth missing (living people)
21st-century American women